Weihnachten mit den Flippers (Christmas With the Flippers) is a Christmas album released by German Schlager group Die Flippers.  The album features fourteen traditional German Christmas songs. It was certified Gold in 1988.

Track listing
 "Oh du fröhliche"
 "Alle Jahre wieder"
 "Vom Himmel hoch da komm ich her"
 "Kommet, ihr Hirten"
 "Kling, Glöckchen, kling"
 "Süßer die Glocken nie klingen"
 "O Tannenbaum"
 "Stille Nacht"
 "Es ist ein Ros entsprungen"
 "Morgen, Kinder wird's was geben"
 "Schlittenfart" (Jingle Bell's)
 "Aba Heidschi Bumbeidschi"
 "Am Weinachtsbaum die Lichter brennen"
 "Leise rieselt der Schnee"

References

Die Flippers albums
1987 Christmas albums
Christmas albums by German artists
German-language albums
Schlager Christmas albums